Hubert Wołąkiewicz (born 21 October 1985 in Skarżysko-Kamienna) is a Polish professional footballer who plays as a centre-back for Wiara Lecha Poznań.

Career

Club
He started his football career in Tęcza 34 Płońsk. In 2002 he joined Amica Wronki and until the end of the 2002/2003 season he played in their junior teams. Then he was in the reserves. On April 11, 2006, he made his debut in the Orange Ekstraklasa in a 0–3 defeat against Korona Kielce. After Amica merged with Lech Poznań, Wołąkiewicz remained in the team from Wronki and played with them in the 2006/2007 season in the third league.

In July 2007, Wołąkiewicz moved to the second-league Lechia Gdańsk, where he quickly became the main defender. In the 2007/2008 season, he and his team were promoted to the Ekstraklasa. On August 7, 2009, he scored the first goal in the above-mentioned league in a 6-2 win against Cracovia.

On January 3, 2011, Hubert Wołąkiewicz signed a contract with Lech Poznań. He made his debut on February 20, 2011 in the cup match against Polonia Warsaw. He played 128 games for Lech, scoring 4 goals. He also played with the team from Poznań in the UEFA Europa League.

In February 2015 he joined the Romanian Astra Giurgiu, from where he left after playing one league match. On June 15, 2015, he signed a two-year contract with Cracovia. He made his debut on July 17 in a 1-0 against Lechia Gdańsk. In the colors of the Stripes he played 64 matches. In 2017 he moved to Chojniczanka Chojnice playing in the first league. For three seasons he played 67 matches for this club and scored 7 goals. In winter 2020, he signed a six-month contract with Widzew Łódź. On March 1, 2020, he made his debut in a 2-2 draw in the second league against Olimpia Elbląg. On July 19, 2020 in the league match with Resovia, due to the limit of substitutions of the Łódź team and Wojciech Pawłowski's red card, he took his place in the goal. It was the first situation since 2001 when a field player replaced the goalkeeper in the Widzew Łódź team.

International
He made his full international debut on October 12, 2010 in a 2-2 draw against Ecuador.

Honours

Lech Poznań
 Ekstraklasa: 2014–15

References

External links 
 
 

1985 births
Living people
People from Skarżysko County
Polish expatriate footballers
Sportspeople from Świętokrzyskie Voivodeship
Polish footballers
Poland international footballers
Amica Wronki players
Lechia Gdańsk players
Lech Poznań players
FC Astra Giurgiu players
Chojniczanka Chojnice players
Widzew Łódź players
Ekstraklasa players
I liga players
II liga players
MKS Cracovia (football) players
Liga I players
Polish expatriate sportspeople in Romania
Expatriate footballers in Romania
Association football defenders